Der Naturforscher ( "The Naturalist") was a German scientific publication of the Enlightenment devoted to natural history. It was published yearly from 1774 to 1804, by J. J. Gebauers Witwe and Joh. Jac. Gebauer at Halle and edited first by Johann Ernst Immanuel Walch (from 1774 to 1778) and later by Johann Christian Daniel von Schreber (from 1779 to 1802). Both editors were also contributors. Most of the articles concern aspects of invertebrate zoology, mostly entomology and conchology. A few concern ornithology and other subjects, including mineralogy.

It is usually bound in fifteen volumes octavo. Indices and registers are given at ten year intervals enumerating 640 memoirs. Just over 150 plates accompany the text. Many of the illustrations are by Johann Stephan Capieux and are of a very high standard.  Armin Geus provides comprehensive indices.

Contributors
Most authors contributing to Der Naturforscher were German, but the journal also included some French authors. No natural history journal published in France existed at the time.
Amongst others, some notable naturalists contributing to Der Naturforscher were:
Johann August Ephraim Goeze
Theodor Gottlieb von Scheven
Josef Aloys Frölich
Nikolaus Joseph Brahm
Eugen Johann Christoph Esper
Johann Kaspar Füssli
Johann Friedrich Gmelin
Siegmund Adrian von Rottemburg
Jean Baptiste Louis d'Audibert de Férussac
Johann Matthäus Bechstein
Friedrich Christian Meuschen
Georg Wolfgang Franz Panzer 
Johann Hermann
Franz von Paula Schrank
Johann Dominikus Schultze
Johann Beckmann
Justus Christian Loder
Charles De Geer
Johann Christoph Meineken (1722 -1790) Mineralogy
Christoph Gottlieb von Murr as C. G. von M

Impact
Claus Nissen described Der Naturforscher as "the most important 18th century German periodical for the descriptive natural sciences". Its taxonomic significance is considerable in entomology and conchology. Although many of the new species described here were subsequently considered junior synonyms, others remain valid.

Some of the valid species first described in Der Naturforscher are several well-known European Lepidoptera: Lysandra bellargus (Rottemburg, 1775), Polyommatus icarus (Rottemburg, 1775), Zygaena lonicerae (Scheven, 1777), Paranthrene tabaniformis (Rottemburg, 1775) and Hyles gallii (Rottemburg, 1775). Valid taxa in phylum Mollusca include Turbo canaliculatus Hermann, 1781, Spondylus americanus Hermann, 1781, Modiolarca impacta (Hermann, 1782) and Semilimax semilimax (J. Férussac, 1802).

Although most ornithology articles are general or faunal lists, an exception exists in the first description of the wood warbler, Phylloscopus sibilatrix (Bechstein, 1793).

Some exotic taxa were also first described in Der Naturforscher, including the fish species Sternoptyx diaphana Hermann, 1781 and the Indomalayan butterfly Euploea phaenareta (Schaller, 1785).

See also
Timeline of entomology – prior to 1800
Science in the Age of Enlightenment

References

External links
 Universitat Bielefeld Digital library Digitised Der Naturforscher 
Animal base 66 articles 
jstor
 Johann Capieux at University of Halle

Defunct journals
German-language journals
Natural history journals